Beden Brook, also Bedens Brook, Beden's Brook, or Beeden's Brook, is a tributary of the Millstone River in central New Jersey in the United States.

Course
The headwaters of the brook are variously given. The more southerly branch of the stream (the official USGS source at ) rises to the west of Hopewell, flowing east, turning south below Hopewell, and then east again to meet the more northerly branch (sourced at ). This rises on the southern slopes of Sourland Mountain, cutting a valley that defines the west side of Pheasant Hill. The combined streams then flow eastward, passing through the Bedens Brook Club and Cherry Valley Country Club to the south of Blawenburg. Past Blawenburg, the twisting brook turns to the northeast, and Cherry Run enters from the south. The brook passes under the Georgetown and Franklin Turnpike (CR-518) and receives Rock Brook on the grounds of the former North Princeton Developmental Center. Turning eastward again, the brook passes under U.S. Route 206 and receives Pike Run before emptying into the Millstone River.

Tributaries
Pike Run
Pine Tree Run
Back Brook
Cruser Brook
Rock Brook
Cat Tail Brook
Cherry Run (not on USGS GNIS)

Sister tributaries
Bear Brook
Cranbury Brook
Devils Brook
Harrys Brook
Heathcote Brook
Indian Run Brook
Little Bear Brook
Millstone Brook
Peace Brook
Rocky Brook
Royce Brook
Simonson Brook
Six Mile Run
Stony Brook
Ten Mile Run
Van Horn Brook

See also
List of rivers of New Jersey
USGS Coordinates in Google Maps

References

Tributaries of the Raritan River
Rivers of New Jersey
Rivers of Somerset County, New Jersey